Jakub Władysław Wojewódzki known as Kuba Wojewódzki (born 2 August 1963 in Koszalin, Poland) is a Polish journalist, TV personality, drummer, and comedian.

Career
Wojewódzki was a judge on the Polish Idol. Apil 5, 2002  June 18, 2005  2002 2005 He also was the Polish representative on the World Idol on 25 December 2003. 

In the 1980s, he was a member of punk bands called System and New Dada. Currently, he is a drummer in the band called Klatu. Since 2002 2006 he has been working  Kuba Wojewodzki Polsat October 4, 2002   June 18, 2006 

Since September 24, 2006, he has been working for TVN. Kuba Wojewodzki 

He has his own TV show called Kuba Wojewódzki and is a  judge on Mam talent!, September 13, 2008 November 27, 2010  2008-2010 2017 Final 10 Edycja Mam Talent  the Polish edition of Britain's got talent and since 2011-2014  also on X-Factor.

Controversy
He was criticized for being extremely harsh on X Factor contestants and for making racist comments. While translating for Nigerian-born auditionee John James Egwu who spoke limited Polish, he claimed that contestant had answered "I married a white woman and then ate her" when asked what he was doing in Poland, and mistranslated "I studied here" as "She was a bit gristly." Wojewódzki then encouraged the audience to laugh at the contestant.

In his talk show, he explores numerous controversial issues. On one of his shows (aired on 25 March 2008), a cartoonist Marek Raczkowski inserted the Polish flag into dog faeces, in the protest against littering public places and criticizing owners who do not clean after their pets.  He tried to send a message that other nations are more responsible in that matter. The incident was widely discussed by the media. On his morning radio show for radio Eska Rock, in June 2011, he said that perhaps there should be "a national register of negroes" and stated that that day's show was sponsored by the Warsaw branch of the Ku Klux Klan. His comments were condemned by members of ethnic minorities in Poland. The radio station was fined 50,000 zlotys and Wojewódzki's comments were described in the report of the radio authorities (Krajowa Rada Radiofonii i Telewizji) as being "unambiguously racist" ("jednoznacznie rasistowskie").

In October, 2013, Wojewódzki claimed to be hurt by an unknown assaulter who burned his face and neck with acid. As revealed later by the police, the fluid was not acid, it was a non-corrosive substance.

TV Show

References

External links

1963 births
Living people
Polish journalists
People from Koszalin
Polish atheists